Sideia Island is an island in the Louisiade Archipelago in Milne Bay Province, Papua New Guinea.

Administration 
The island is part of the following Wards: 
 Sauasauaga, on the southwest cape. (This Ward is mostly on Sariba)
 Gotai, on the southeast area (with Populai Island)
 Sekuku, on the central area (with Dinana Island)
 Tegerauna, on the northeast area.
 Sideia, on the northwest area.
All Wards belong to Bwanabwana Rural Local Level Government Area LLG, Samarai-Murua District, which are in Milne Bay Province.

History 
Sideia Island was sighted by Europeans when the Spanish expedition of Luís Vaez de Torres arrived on 18 July 1606. Their ship, San Pedro anchored at Oba Bay in the south west, that they then named Puerto San Francisco. It was later renamed as Puerto Lerma after the 1st Duke of Lerma. Torres named the island St. Bonaventure. 

The mission in that island was established on April 22, 1932 by the Australian Province of the French Congregation Missionaries of the Sacred Heart (MSC). By 1942, it was fully developed and became the base for other missions in the nearby islands. Many facilities were set up to provide education, medical assistance and ways of living to the native of the area.

Geography 
Sideia is located East of the end of New Guinea mainland. Its area is 101.3 km².
The island is part of the Sideia group, itself a part of Samarai Islands of the Louisiade Archipelago. 
It is located between Sariba Island and Basilaki Island. 
The island of Sideia is quite near Alotau and can be reached in less than three hours by motor boat.

Demographics 
The population of 1890 is living in 30 villages across the island. The most important one, and where the dock is located, is Sideia. The other villages: Lamoasi, Mwalotakilili, Dumalawe, Paka, Gugui, Gadogadowa, Oba, Memeali, Kunubala, Gabutau, Makabweabweau, Nasauwai, Tabuara, Liliki, Kalu, Gotai, Wanahaua, Sekuku, Waiyau, Goteia, Kaula, Kubi, Boikalakalawa, Namoa, Dulaona, Balagatete, Tegerauna

Economy 
The islanders, are farmers as opposed to eastern Louisiade Archipelago islanders. they grow Sago, Taro, and Yams for crops.

Transportation 
There is a dock at Sideia.

Flora and fauna
The following mammals are on the island:
 Polynesian rat
 Black rat
 Eastern common cuscus
 Moncton's mosaic-tailed rat
 Black-tailed mosaic-tailed rat
 Eastern rat
 Giant white-tailed rat
 New Guinea naked-backed fruit bat
 Long-tongued nectar bat
 Small flying fox
 Island tube-nosed fruit bat
 Geoffroy's rousett
 Common blossom bat
The following fish are near the island:
 Acanthuridae
 Balistidae
 Belonidae
 Carangidae
 Holocentridae
 Kyphosidae
 Lethrinidae
 Lutjanidae
 Mugilidae
 Mullidae
 Scaridae
 Serranidae
 Siganidae
 Sphyraenidae

References

Islands of Milne Bay Province
Louisiade Archipelago